Hwaseong IBK Altos is a South Korean women's professional volleyball team founded in 2011. In the 2012−13 V-League season, just one year after the team was founded, the club won both the regular season title, having won 25 out of 30 regular season games, and its first championship. The club became the first Korean professional sports team to win a championship title in their second season. Since then, the Altos have won two more championships, in the 2014–15 and 2016–17 seasons. They are based in Hwaseong and are members of the Korea Volleyball Federation (KOVO). Their home arena is Hwaseong Indoor Arena in Hwaseong.

Honours

Domestic
V-League
Regular season champions (3): 2012−13, 2013−14, 2015−16 
Regular season runners-up (3): 2014–15, 2016–17, 2017–18
Championship winners (3): 2012−13, 2014−15, 2016–17
Championship runners-up (3): 2013−14, 2015−16, 2017–18

KOVO Cup
Winners (3): 2013, 2015, 2016
Runners-up: 2012

International 
VTV International Women's Volleyball Cup
Third place: 2012

Season-by-season records

Players

2021−22 team

References

External links 
  

Volleyball clubs established in 2011
Sport in Gyeonggi Province
Women's volleyball teams in South Korea
2011 establishments in South Korea